The S2 5.5, also called the Grand Slam 5.5, is an American sailing dinghy that was designed by Don Wennersten as a racer and day sailer and first built in 1982. The designation indicates the approximate length overall in meters.

The design was the smallest boat S2 Yachts produced and its only dingy model.

Production
The design was built by S2 Yachts in Holland, Michigan, United States from 1982 until 1983, with 70 boats completed, but it is now out of production.

Design
The S2 5.5 is a recreational sailboat, built predominantly of fiberglass, with wood trim. It has a fractional sloop rig, a raked stem, a plumb transom, a transom-hung rudder controlled by a tiller and a retractable centerboard. It displaces  and has a small cuddy cabin for stowage.

With it retracted the boat can operate in shallow water, be beached or ground transported on a trailer.

See also
List of sailing boat types

References

External links
Photo of an S2 5.5

Dinghies
1980s sailboat type designs
Sailing yachts
Sailboat type designs by Don Wennersten
Sailboat types built by S2 Yachts